On 15 January 2015, Belgian police carried out a raid on premises in Verviers, Belgium. According to news sources, the raids were an anti-terrorist operation against Islamist radicals.

Operations
Two suspects died in the raids, which involved heavy gunfire, with a third being seriously wounded.

Other operations were carried out in Brussels and the nearby communes of Schaerbeek, Sint-Jans-Molenbeek, Vilvoorde, and Zaventem. An armed man was reported to have been arrested in Brussels.

The Belgian prosecutor's office stated that the raids were an operation against a jihadist terrorist cell, reportedly believed to have links to ISIS, on the verge of committing a terrorist attack.

Police are investigating the possibility of links to the Charlie Hebdo shooting in neighbouring France. The men killed in the raid, Redouane Hagaoui and Tarik Jadaoun, were alleged by police to have been planning to attack sellers of the "survivors' issue" of Charlie Hebdo released following the attack in Paris.

Response
On 17 January 2015, the Belgian government began a deployment of troops throughout Belgium to defend potential terrorist targets, Operation Vigilant Guardian.

Verviers terror cell trial
A trial against 16 members of the terrorist cell dismantled in Verviers began in 2016. Nine of the defendants were still at large and tried in absentia, including two Belgian, five French, one Moroccan and one Dutch national, who were thought to be fighting for the ISIL in Syria, to be in hiding or to be deceased. Belgian police said the group was on the verge of a coordinated attack of killing police officers in public roads and in police stations, and police had found "Kalashnikov assault rifles, explosives, ammunition and communications equipment – along with police uniforms that could have been used for the plot" during the raids.

The cell was found to have been led by Abdelhamid Abaaoud via telephone from Athens, who evaded capture in the Greek capital. A member of the Brussels ISIL terror cell, he later had a leading role in the November 2015 Paris attacks.

In 2016, members of the cell were sentenced to between 8 and 16 years imprisonment.

See also

 2015 Saint-Denis raid
 2015 Thalys train attack
 2015 Brussels lockdown
 2016 Brussels bombings
 Jewish Museum of Belgium shooting (2014)
 Terrorism in the European Union

References 

2015 in Brussels
Attacks in Europe in 2015
Counterterrorism in Belgium
Deaths by firearm in Belgium
Islamic terrorism in Belgium
January 2015 events in Europe
January 2015 Île-de-France attacks
History of Liège Province
Police raids on Islamists
Terrorist incidents in Belgium in 2015
Verviers